Carex sempervirens, called the evergreen sedge, is a species of flowering plant in the genus Carex, native to the mountains of Europe. It is common plant in nutrient-limited grasslands above and below the treeline.

References

sempervirens
Flora of Europe
Plants described in 1787